LaSalle Plaza is a Class A skyscraper located in downtown Minneapolis, Minnesota that is 387 ft (118 meters) tall. It is the 20th-tallest building in the city and fills a city block, bound by 8th Street S, LaSalle Avenue, 9th Street S, and Hennepin Avenue. The complex includes a thirty-story office tower and a two-story retail base. It was designed and developed in 1991 around the pre-existing Historic State Theatre.

The building is skyway connected to 811 LaSalle, Residence Inn Downtown Minneapolis/City Center, Target Center, Target Field, the University of St. Thomas, and Target.

Art
The building houses multiple art pieces, including Totem Pole by George Morrison, and Top Hat, a piece by Stanton G. Sears portraying Fred Astaire.

Tenants
LaSalle Plaza is currently leased to multiple small and large tenants. Tenants include:
 AECOM
 The Capital Grille
 CBRE
 Bally Sports North (formerly Fox Sports North) (offices & broadcast studios)
 Robins Kaplan LLP

See also
List of tallest buildings in Minneapolis

References

Emporis

Skyscraper office buildings in Minneapolis
Apartment buildings in Minnesota
Buildings and structures completed in 1991
1991 establishments in Minnesota